CCTV-7 is a Chinese free-to-air television channel owned by China Central Television. The channel primarily carries programming devoted to the People's Liberation Army. Prior to 1 August 2019, the channel also carried agriculture-related programmes. On 1 August 2019 (coinciding with the anniversary of the Army's establishment), the channel dropped its agriculture programmes, which moved to the new CCTV-17 channel from 23 September.

Programming 
Xinwen Lianbo (simulcast with CCTV-1 and CCTV-13)
Defense News on mornings and middays
Military Report
Defense Review
Military Technology
Military Documentaries


Former programming

Agriculture (Moved  CCTV-17)

Yangguang Dadao (lit "Sunshine Boulevard")
Meiri Nongjing (lit "Agriculture Daily")
Jujiao Sannong (lit "Agricultural Watch")
The Big World of Village
Xiang Yue (lit "Dating in the Countryside")

References

China Central Television channels
Television channels and stations established in 1994
1994 establishments in China